La Délivrande war cemetery is a Second World War cemetery of Commonwealth soldiers in France, located  north of Caen, Normandy. The cemetery contains 943 commonwealth war graves and 180 German war graves.

History
The majority of the soldiers interred in the cemetery were killed on D-Day, 6 June 1944 and the following weeks as the Allies advanced south towards Caen. There are a number of burials of soldiers killed on Sword Beach – especially from the sectors Oboe and Peter.

The cemetery has a number of double headstones marked with "BURIED NEAR THIS SPOT".

Photographs

Location
The cemetery is 14 km north of Caen on the D.7.

See also

 American Battle Monuments Commission
 UK National Inventory of War Memorials
 German War Graves Commission
 List of military cemeteries in Normandy

References

Further reading
 Shilleto, Carl, and Tolhurst, Mike (2008). "A Traveler’s Guide to D-Day and the Battle of Normandy". Northampton, Mass.: Interlink.

External links
 

British military memorials and cemeteries
Canadian military memorials and cemeteries
Commonwealth War Graves Commission cemeteries in France
Operation Overlord cemeteries
1944 establishments in France
World War II memorials in France